Cofinal may refer to:
Cofinal (mathematics)
Cofinality (mathematics)
Cofinal (music), a part of some Gregorian chants